Dada Kamred is a novel written by Yashpal. Dada Kamred was Yashpal's first novel.

References

1941 debut novels
20th-century Indian novels
Hindi-language novels
Rajkamal Prakashan books